Hellboy is a fictional character, created by writer-artist Mike Mignola.

Hellboy may also refer to:

Comic book mini-series
List of Hellboy comics, a chronological list of Hellboy, B.P.R.D., and related comic books and collections

Feature films
Hellboy (2004 film), 2004 supernatural action-thriller film directed by Guillermo del Toro, inspired by the fictional Dark Horse Comics character
Hellboy II: The Golden Army, 2008 fantasy-superhero film sequel directed by Guillermo del Toro
Hellboy (2019 film), 2019 supernatural superhero film reboot directed by Neil Marshall and heavily based on the fictional Dark Horse Comics character

Animated films 
Hellboy Animated, original straight-to-DVD animated films based upon the comic book character
Hellboy: Sword of Storms, first of the Hellboy Animated series
Hellboy: Blood and Iron, second in the Hellboy Animated series

Video games
Hellboy: Asylum Seeker, 2000 video game, developed by Cryo Studios
Hellboy: The Science of Evil, 2008 video game based on the comic book character of the same name

Music 
 Hellboy (Lil Peep mixtape), 2016

Other uses
Regaliceratops, a dinosaur nicknamed "Hellboy"
Jeremy Hellickson, a baseball pitcher for the Philadelphia Phillies, known by this nickname in media and fans